Jeff Atmajian (born 1960 in Fresno, California) is an arranger and orchestrator for films. His steady clientele are composers such as James Newton Howard, Marc Shaiman, Rachel Portman, Mark Watters, John Debney and Gabriel Yared. He also has six composing credits, primarily for short films. In 2006, he scored the 90-minute documentary about the Armenian genocide called Screamers.

References

External links
 

1960 births
Living people
American male composers
21st-century American composers
American people of Armenian descent
21st-century American male musicians